Dog Days is a 1995 album by American alternative country group Blue Mountain. In 2008 the band released a remastered version of the album. Scott Hull remastered the album. Six bonus tracks were added to the new release, drawing from out of print albums and similar material.

Track listings

1995 release 
Mountain Girl
Let's Ride
Blue Canoe
Soul Sister
Wink
Slow Suicide
A Band Called Bud
Epitaph
ZZQ
The Eyes of a Child
Jimmy Carter
Let's Go Runnin'
Hippy Hotel
Special Rider Blues

2008 remastered release
Mountain Girl
Let's Ride
Blue Canoe
Soul Sister
Wink
Slow Suicide
A Band Called Bud
Epitaph
ZZQ
Eyes of a Child
Jimmy Carter
Let's Go Runnin'
Hippy Hotel
Special Rider Blues
Broke Down & Busted
Song Without a Name
Westbound
Hermit of the Hidden Beach
My Wicked, Wicked Ways
To a Toad

References

1995 albums
Blue Mountain (band) albums
Roadrunner Records albums
Albums produced by Eric Ambel